Barbu Church is a parish church of the Church of Norway in Arendal Municipality in Agder county, Norway. It is located in the Barbu area of the town of Arendal. It is the church for the Barbu parish which is part of the Arendal prosti (deanery) in the Diocese of Agder og Telemark. The brown, brick church was built in a long church design in 1880 using plans drawn up by the architect Jacob Wilhelm Nordan. The church seats about 500 people.

History
Originally, people living in the Barbu area were part of the Tromøy Church parish, and they had a long journey to the church. In 1859, fundraising and planning began for a new church on the mainland part of the parish. There was no agreement on where the church should be located and due to the quickly growing areas, it was decided to built two churches. Stokken Church was built in 1877 for the northeastern part of the mainland part of the parish and then in 1880 Barbu Church was built to serve the southwestern part of the mainland area in the parish. The new church was consecrated on 17 September 1880 by the Bishop Jørgen Engebretsen Moe. The brick church has a rectangular nave with a chancel that is a half-octagon. The brick building exterior is covered with gray/brown plaster.

Media gallery

See also
List of churches in Agder og Telemark

References

Buildings and structures in Arendal
Churches in Agder
Brick churches in Norway
19th-century Church of Norway church buildings
Churches completed in 1880
1880 establishments in Norway